Giani Partap Singh (Punjabi: ਗਿਆਨੀ ਪ੍ਰਤਾਪ ਸਿੰਘ; 3 January 1904 – 10 May 1984) was a Sikh priest and Panjabi writer. He served as the first acting Jathedar of Akal Takht from 19 December 1937 to 1948 and 19th Jathedar of Akal Takht from 1952 to 15 February 1955.

Early life and career 
Partap Singh was born on 3 January 1904, at Nara village in Rawalpindi division of Panjab, British India. His father was Makhan Singh Sasan and mother Mathura Devi. His grandfather, Sundar Singh served in the army of Maharaja Ranjit Singh. Between 1909 and 1918, Singh completed 5 years of education at the local primary school in Nara and further education at the middle school in Bishan Daur. Near the completion of his primary education, he took the vows of the Khalsa and became an initiated Sikh. Subsequently, for some 3 years he studied Sikh literature and attended the services of Singh Sabha Movement and Isher Singh Rara Sahib.

In 1922, Singh enrolled into Khalsa Updesh College at Gujranwala, where he passed the certificate of Giani with the second highest marks in Panjab. From 1918 to 1921, he attended various conferences organised by Chief Khalsa Diwan, Na-Milvartan Lehir and Sikh League. These conferences had a great impact on his mind and conscience.

In 1923, Singh contributed with immense participation in the Kar Seva (literally "service with hands") of Harmandir Sahib. Considering the service and education of the Giani, Shiromani Gurdwara Parbandhak Committee (SGPC) employed him as a priest. Soon after he joined, the East India Company declared that the SGPC was against the law. The government arrested various SGPC workers including Singh and imprisoned them at Jhang and Multan. During the one and half years of imprisonment, the Giani managed to learn multiple languages such as English, Urdu, Persian and Hindi.

Works 
 Zaat Paat te Chhoot Chhaat, 1933
 Gurmat Lecture, 1944
 Itihasic Lecture Do Bhaag, 1945
 Sadha Desh Te Usdian Smasiawan, 1945
 Bhagat Darshan, 1945
 Gurmat Philosophy, 1946
 Sansaar Da Dharmic Itihas, 1948
 Kudrat De Chamatkaar, 1947
 Pakistani Ghalughara, 1948
 Akali Lahir Da Ithas, 1951
 Baba Khuda Singh, 1962
 Baba Bir Singh Naurangabad, 1962
 Takhtan Bare Vichar, 1966
 Nakli Nirankari, 1967
 Shaheed Darshan Singh Pheruma, 1968
 Radha Swami Mat Darpan, 1969
 Gurbani Es Jag Meh Chanan, 1975
 Kuka Guru Dum, 1972
 Mahabali Guru Gobind Singh, 1974
 Hind Di Chadar Guru Tegh Bahadar, 1975
 Akali Lahir De Mahaan Neta, 1976
 Amritsar Sifti Da Ghar, 1977

Jathedar of Akal Takht 
The inauguration of Singh as the first vice Jathedar of Akal Takht took place on 19 December 1937. He served alongside Mohan Singh Nagoke up to 1948 and later served as the Jathedar of Akal Takht from 1952 to 15 February 1955. He resign due to political difference with Master Tara Singh.

Family and personal life 
In 1918, Singh married Shaant Kaur, daughter of Mangal Singh. The couple had six children.

Death 
He was assassinated by Jarnail Singh Bhindranwale's companion Daya Singh in Amritsar, Punjab, India for criticising the occupation of the Akal Takht of the Golden temple by Bhindranwale and his corhorts. He described this occupation as sacrilegious to the Sikh faith.

References 

1904 births
1984 deaths
Punjabi people
Punjabi-language writers
Sikh writers
Indian religious leaders
Assassinated Indian people
People murdered in India
Jathedars of Akal Takht
People from Rawalpindi
India MPs 1962–1967